Tochmaland is a smock mill in Kollum, Friesland, Netherlands, which was built in 1893. The mill has been restored to working order. It is listed as a Rijksmonument, number 23743.

History

Tochmaland was built in to drain the  Tochmaland polder. It was originally the sawmill Welgelegen, Veendam, Groningen. The mill was moved by millwright J B Donders of Tilburg, North Brabant, who had quoted a lower price for the move than millwrights from Kollum. It was formerly fitted with four patent sails. The mill ceased working in 1946 when the windshaft broke and repair was deemed too expensive. A brick shed containing an electrically driven Archimedes' screw was erected next to the mill.

A proposal to demolish the mill was rejected by the mayor of the gemeente Kollumerland en Nieuwkruisland. On 30 December 1948, the mill was purchased by the gemeente. Restorations were undertaken in 1949, 1963 and 1983. since 1995, an electric motor has been installed in Tochmaland to drive its Archimedes' screw, and the installation in the brick shed demolished.

Description

Tochmaland is what the Dutch describe as an Grondzeiler. It is a two-storey smock mill on a single-storey base. There is no stage, the sails reaching down almost to ground level. The mill is winded by tailpole and winch. The smock and cap are thatched. The sails are Common sails. The sails are carried on a cast-iron windshaft which was cast by H J Koning, Foxham, Groningen, in 1912. The windshaft also carries the brake wheel which has 63 cogs. This drives the wallower (33 cogs) at  the top of the upright shaft. At the bottom of the upright shaft is the crown wheel, which has 44 cogs drives a gearwheel with 41 cogs on the axle of the Archimedes' screw. The axle of the Archimedes' screw is  diameter. It is inclined at 19½°. Each revolution of the screw lifts  of water.

Public access
Tochmaland is open on Saturday mornings from 9:30 a.m. to 12:00 p.m.

References

Windmills in Friesland
Windmills completed in 1893
Smock mills in the Netherlands
Windpumps in the Netherlands
Rijksmonuments in Friesland
Octagonal buildings in the Netherlands